The Unimat was a series of combination machines sold for light hobbyist engineering, such as model engineering. They were distinctive as the same major components could be re-arranged into either a lathe or milling machine.

It covers a range of commercially sold machines intended for machining and metalworking for model making hobbyists manufactured by the Emco company. The machines enable the user to have a drill press, lathe and milling machine. Most of the Unimat range is no longer in production, but the smallest Unimat 1 and its variants is now produced by the Cool Tool Gmbh.

Models

Original Emco
 Unimat DB, Unimat DB-200
 Unimat SL, Unimat SL-1000
 Unimat 3

To Emco Specs
 Unimat Basic
 Unimat 4 (lower quality clockmakers/watchmakers lathe with parts interchangeable with the Unimat 3)
 Unimat Compact 5
 Unimat Compact 8E
 Unimat Compact V8
 Maximat F1-P Mill
 Unimat Mill

TheCoolTool company
 Unimat 1 Basic (model woodworking)
This model of the Unimat 1 has many plastic parts. It is capable of working mostly wood and plastics.
 Unimat 1 Classic 
This model of the Unimat 1 has many plastic parts and plastic machining cross slides. It is capable of working wood, plastic and soft metals i.e. aluminum and brass. It is the same machine as the basic with additional capabilities such as wood turning, sawing, drilling, milling and metal turning.
 Unimat PowerLine
This is a collection of enhancements for any of the Unimat 1 tools. It includes options for more power, table saw and router table.
 Unimat MetalLine
This model of the Unimat 1 has been upgraded to metal parts and cross slides that give the unit a higher level of accuracy. It is capable of working any of the materials from the Basic or Classic versions plus soft steel.

See also 
 Metalworking
 Machine shop

References

External links 
 Unimat DBSL Lathe, Belts, Manual,Links.
 Cooltool website in Austria
 Unimat website in North America

Machine tools
Metalworking tools
Rotating machines
Lathes
Scale modeling